Niall Oge O'Neill (Irish: Niall Óg Ó Néill) was a lord of Clandeboye in medieval Ireland. A son of Niall Mór O'Neill, he succeeded his brother, Phelim Bacagh O'Neill, to the lordship of Clandeboye after his death in 1533. He reigned until his own death in 1537, after which he was succeeded by his brother Murtagh Dulenach O'Neill. O'Neill's nickname "Óg" meant "young".

Issue
Brian Faghartach O'Neill (died 1548) — Lord of Upper Clandeboye
Shane O'Neill
Niall McBrian Fertagh O'Neill (died 5 February 1601) — Lord of Upper Clandeboye
Conn O'Neill (died 1619) — Lord of Upper Clandeboye
Daniel O'Neill (1612 – 24 October 1664) — Colonel in the Army of Charles I & Charles II
Conn Oge O'Neill (died 13 June 1643) — Colonel in Irish Confederate Army
Aodh Meirgeach O'Neill
Tuathal O'Neill
Phelim McToole O'Neill (died 22 June 1650) — Colonel in Irish Confederate Army, killed at Battle of Scarrifholis
Henry McToole O'Neill
Owen O'Neill — Captain in Army of James II
Aodh O'Neill (died 1555) — The Annals of the Four Masters regarded him as King of Clandeboye
Eoghan O'Neill (died 5 May 1601)
Brian Modortha O'Neill
Phelim Dubh O'Neill
Sir Conn O'Neill (died Jan 1589)
Domhnall O'Neill (died 1584)

References

External links
The Peerage

Clandeboye
16th-century Irish people
O'Neill dynasty